Launceston Airport  is a regional airport on the outskirts of Launceston, Tasmania. The airport is located in the industrial area of Western Junction  from Launceston city centre. It is Tasmania's second busiest after Hobart Airport; it can also run as a curfew free airport.

In the 2007/2008 financial year, the airport had a record 1.1 million passengers, up 10% on the previous year; 255,000 passengers passed through the airport in the three months to 30 September, up 7% on the previous year. 309,000 passengers passed through in January – March 2008, the highest ever number in a calendar quarter, up 11% on the previous year.

It is currently Australia's 13th busiest airport, handling 1,126,572 passengers in the 2008–09 financial and 1,124,000 passengers in the 2009–10 financial year. The total number of passenger movements through Launceston Airport is projected to increase annually by 2.7 per cent during the forecast period to 2,000,000 in 2030–31. The expected growth rate reflects slower forecast longer-term economic growth in Australia, the maturation of the impact of low-cost carriers on passenger movement growth and an expected increase in domestic airfares.

History

After the formation of the Tasmanian Aero Club in 1927, the first air travel facility in Tasmania was built on the site. In July 1929 the Home Territories Department acquired land at the Western Junction, then also called Valley of Springs, for a £20,400 ($41,000) aerodrome. The Western Junction Aerodrome was officially opened in 1929 and opened for use in 1930. In February 1931, around 20,000 people crammed into Evandale Road to watch Colonel Brinsmead, Controller of Civil Aviation, officially open Western Junction as a government aerodrome. During 1932, small aircraft flew from Launceston to Flinders Island.

From August 1940 until late 1944, the airport used by the Royal Australian Air Force as a base for No. 7 Elementary Flying Training School. It was Tasmania's only RAAF Base. Two of the Bellman hangars from this period are still located at the airport, on the southern Freight and GA operations area.

In 1962 under the leadership of Tony John, a plan for major redevelopment of the airport was approved. This included strengthening of all pavements, a runway extension, and a new terminal building. The airport was officially reopened that same year as Launceston Airport. In October 1982 the runway was further upgraded to Boeing 767 standard. In 1998, the airport was privatised, and is now owned jointly by Launceston City Council and Australia Pacific Airports Corporation. The collapse of Ansett Australia in 2001, the introduction of Virgin Blue (now Virgin Australia) and Jetstar in 2001 and 2004; and the creation of the Australian low-cost airline market; have all contributed to a dramatic increase in aircraft movements at Launceston Airport. In 2007 the airport reached the milestone of one million passenger movements per year. Tiger Airways Australia also introduced services, and withdrew again in July 2010.

Terminal

Launceston Airport underwent a A$20 million redevelopment, the largest expansion in its history at the time. The project doubled the size of the terminal and was completed in November 2009. The airport currently has a bar; James Boag Bar and Kitchen, two café outlets; Hudsons Coffee, Wilderness Espresso and a News and Gift Shop The Launceston Store. 
As part of the expansion, two new gate lounges were installed (Gate Lounges 2 and 3), with the capability for two more gate lounges when required in future. The new departure area has a single location for all airlines' check-in operations: QantasLink, Jetstar and Virgin Australia have a total of 12 check-in counters. A checked bag screening (CBS) facility is linked to these check-in counters, allowing all aircraft checked baggage to be screened as required by the Commonwealth government from 1 December 2008. A  baggage arrivals hall was constructed, and two new baggage carousels were installed: the first one opened to the public on 18 March, with the second following in April. Previously passengers had to take their bags from the airline baggage equipment. A new multi-tenant car rental counter has been constructed next to the baggage arrivals area. There was a 1000m² expansion of the main landside passenger lounge, with views of the apron and runway.

The redeveloped terminal was officially opened on 12 March 2010 by the Premier of Tasmania, David Bartlett.

As of August 2022 further works had commenced at Launceston Airport to expand the check-in area and install the latest state-of- the-art security technology, with passenger numbers expected to double over the next 15 years. Supported by the State and Federal governments, the $11 million project will double the size of the airport’s check-in hall, with an additional 650 square metres offering space for self-check-in equipment, an easier security experience and an enhanced retail offering. The installation of new security technology will allow passengers to keep laptops, tablets and aerosols in their bags. 

The entrance to the Qantas Regional lounge will also be moved behind security screening, meaning travellers with access to the lounge can spend more time there before boarding their flight.

Airlines and destinations
The Qantas Group is the dominant operator at Launceston airport, with Jetstar operates up to six daily flights to/from Melbourne, two daily flights to/from Sydney and one daily flight to/from Brisbane throughout the year. QantasLink operates up to four flights daily to/from Melbourne. Virgin Australia operates up to five daily flights to/from Melbourne, one daily flight to/from Sydney, five flights per week on selected days to/from Brisbane as well as a number of seasonal weekly flights to/from Adelaide and Perth.

Sharp Airlines offer up to three flights a day to Flinders Island and up to two flights a day to King Island via Burnie. This service is reduced on weekends.

Airlines of Tasmania provide twice weekly services to both Cape Barren Island and Hobart, in addition to light aircraft charter.

Passenger

Cargo

Traffic and statistics
Launceston Airport's passenger numbers have increased dramatically in recent years, significantly exceeding the airports forecasts in the Airport Master Plan 2005. The passenger numbers achieved in the 2007-08 fiscal year were not anticipated until at least fiscal year 2019–20.

Statistics

Operations

Access
Primary access to Launceston Airport is via private vehicles. Launceston Airport has a short term and a long term car park, as well as an overflow car park that can accommodate 150 cars. Public transport is not provided between Launceston Airport and the City of Launceston. Numerous taxi services are available as well as Airport Shuttle Buses that operate mainly from the City Centre to the airport but also connecting the Northwest Tasmanian towns of Devonport, Ulverstone and Burnie.

Tassielink Transit bus route "Evandale-Perth-Longford- Cressy" with three daily buses calling on Evandale Road outside Launceston Airport (no services on Sundays and Public Holidays).

Accidents and incidents
On 29 May 2003, Qantas Flight 1737 – en route from Melbourne Airport – was involved in an attempted hijacking shortly after takeoff. The would-be hijacker, a passenger named David Robinson, intended to fly the aircraft into the Walls of Jerusalem National Park located in central Tasmania. The flight attendants and passengers successfully subdued and restrained Robinson, and the aircraft returned to Melbourne, where it landed safely.

See also
 List of airports in Tasmania

References

External links

 

Airports in Tasmania
Airports established in 1929
1929 establishments in Australia